Walter Tuch (1913–1969) was an Austrian cinematographer.  He was active in both Austrian and West German cinema, and later in television. He was the younger brother of actress Jane Tilden.

Selected filmography
 Flowers from Nice (1936)
 Capers (1937)
 Your Heart Is My Homeland (1953)
 A Night in Venice (1953)
 The Forester of the Silver Wood (1954)
 Goetz von Berlichingen (1955)
 The Dairymaid of St. Kathrein (1955)
 Engagement at Wolfgangsee (1956)
 Imperial and Royal Field Marshal (1956)
 War of the Maidens (1957)
 So ein Millionär hat's schwer (1958)
 Hello Taxi (1958)
 Girls for the Mambo-Bar (1959)
 Guitars Sound Softly Through the Night (1960)
 Our Crazy Aunts (1961)
 The Cry of the Wild Geese (1961)
 The Turkish Cucumbers (1962)
 No Kissing Under Water (1962)
 Two Bavarians in Bonn (1962)
 Manhattan Night of Murder (1965)

References

Bibliography
 Fritsche, Maria. Homemade Men In Postwar Austrian Cinema: Nationhood, Genre and Masculinity . Berghahn Books, 2013.
 Von Dassanowsky, Robert. Austrian Cinema: A History. McFarland, 2005.

External links

1913 births
1969 deaths
Austrian cinematographers
People from Ústí nad Labem